Lophopoeum circumflexum is a species of beetle in the family Cerambycidae. It was described by Bates in 1863.

References

Lophopoeum
Beetles described in 1863